Baltoscandal is an international theatre festival, which every two year takes place in Estonia. It is the biggest and oldest international theatre festival in Estonia.

First festival took place in 1990 in Pärnu. The festival was found by Von Krahl Theatre and Rakvere Theatre. Since 1994, the festival take place in Rakvere.

References

External links
 

Theatre festivals
Theatre in Estonia